James Rose (born 16 April 1996) is a professional Australian rules footballer who played for the Sydney Swans in the Australian Football League (AFL). He was recruited from the Sturt Football Club in the South Australian National Football League with the thirty-seventh selection in the 2014 national draft. He was delisted at the conclusion of the 2019 AFL season.

Rose made his debut in round 21, 2015, against  in the eighth edition of the Sydney Derby. After coming on as the substitute in the fourth quarter, Rose kicked three goals as the Swans won by 89 points. He then played his second game, and his first finals match, in the Swans' semi-final loss to  a month later. He wears guernsey number 1, a number previously donned by past club legends such as Paul Roos and Barry Hall.

In January 2016, Rose signed on with the Swans for a further two seasons. He was selected for his first game of the year in round 11 against  where he kicked a goal.

References

External links

1996 births
Living people
Sturt Football Club players
Australian rules footballers from South Australia
Sydney Swans players